Kwang-jo, also spelled Kwang-cho, is a Korean male given name.

People with this name include:
Choi Kwang-jo (born 1942), South Korean taekwondo national champion
Jo Gwang-jo (1482–1519), Joseon Dynasty neo-Confucian reformer
Yoon Kwang-cho (born 1946), South Korean ceramic artist

See also
List of Korean given names

Korean masculine given names